Ruth E. Adomeit (January 30, 1910 – February 16, 1996) was an American writer, editor, collector of miniature books and philanthropist.

Life
Adomeit was educated at Wellesley College, where she began her interest in miniature books after her father, George Adomeit, gave her two of the Kingsport Press's miniature books by Abraham Lincoln and Calvin Coolidge. She edited The Miniature Book Collector from 1960 to 1962, and was a leading member of the Miniature Book Society. She was also a naturalist with a keen interest in bats and was a "Founder’s Circle member" of Bat Conservation International.

Miniature book collection 
After her father sparked her interest in miniature books Ruth started a collection that would be among the largest in the world. The books include miniature volumes by Abraham Lincoln and Calvin Coolidge, as well as miniature form record keeping of cuneiform tablets (2000 B.C.) to contemporary small press and artists' books.

Rare books 
The collection includes many rare books such as From Morn Till Eve, a miniature book that presents biblical quotations in a devotional form, with one phrase for each morning and evening of a month. The Online Computer Library Center (OCLC) had listed "the only known copy as being in the collection of famed miniature book collector Ruth E. Adomeit".

Lilly Library
Adomeit left her collection of miniature books to Indiana University, where it is housed in the Lilly Library. She also left historical papers, the "Ruth E. Adomeit papers, 1907-1958" concerning her father, and the "George G. Adomeit papers, 1880-1968" to the Archives of American Art.

Works
Three Centuries of Thumb Bibles: a Checklist, New York: Garland Pub., 1980. "It remains the standard reference book on the subject, essential to any scholar or collector in the field."
Foreword, in Whitney Balliett, Duke Ellington Remembered: New York notes, Newport Beach, CA: Gold Stein Press, 1981. A short essay in memory of Achille  J. St. Onge (Worcester, MA; 1935-1977).

References

External links
Ruth E. Adomeit at Heifer International Foundation book of remembrance

1910 births
1996 deaths
American book and manuscript collectors
Women collectors
Lilly Library
American women philanthropists
20th-century American philanthropists
Wellesley College alumni
American people of German descent
20th-century women philanthropists